Gloppefjorden or Gloppenfjorden is a fjord in Gloppen Municipality in Vestland county, Norway. The river Gloppeelva is the primary inflow on the fjord. The river comes from the large lake Breimsvatnet. The most notable village areas are Sandane, Vereide, and Sørstranda. The European route E39 highway runs along the eastern side of the fjord. Sandane Airport, Anda is located near the mouth of the fjord.

See also
 List of Norwegian fjords

References

Fjords of Vestland
Gloppen